Pithapuram Nageswara Rao (5 May 1930 – 5 March 1996) was an Indian playback singer who worked in the early period of Telugu cinema. He sang thousands of songs, mostly of a comedic nature, in the 1950s and 1960s along with Madhavapeddi Satyam and others. He also sang for a couple of movies in Kannada.

Brief life sketch

Nageswara Rao was born on 5 May 1930 to Viswanadham and Appayyamma in Pithapuram, East Godavari district, Andhra Pradesh, India. His surname is "Patharlagadda"; but known since childhood with his birthplace Pithapuram. His father was a good drama actor. He also developed an interest in acting during his school days. He not only acts but also used to sing from behind the screen to other less capable artists. He wanted to try his luck in cinema and ran away from home to Madras.

He got a chance to sing in Mangala Sutram (1946) at the age of 16 years.  He later sang in Chandralekha (1948) of Gemini Studios, and since established in the field. He sang some thousands of songs mostly for Comedy characters. Ayyayyo Jebulo Dabbulu Poyene (Kula Gothralu, 1962), Maa Oollo Oka Paduchundi (Ave Kallu, 1967) He last time sang in Bommarillu (1978) as Challani Ramayya Chakkani Seetamma.

He died on 5 March 1996.

Filmography
These are some of the important songs he has voiced:

External links
 
 Photograph and Filmography at Early Tollywood.com

Telugu playback singers
1930 births
1996 deaths
People from East Godavari district
20th-century Indian singers
Singers from Andhra Pradesh
Film musicians from Andhra Pradesh